Olearia polita is a species of flowering plant in the family Asteraceae. It is found only in New Zealand.

References

polita
Flora of New Zealand
Endangered flora of New Zealand
Taxonomy articles created by Polbot